The 2016 NCAA Division I men's soccer tournament (also known as the 2016 College Cup) was the 58th annual single-elimination tournament to determine the national champion of NCAA Division I men's collegiate soccer. The first, second, third, and quarterfinal rounds were held at college campus sites across the United States during November and December 2016, with host sites determined by seeding and record. The four-team College Cup finals was played at BBVA Compass Stadium in Houston, Texas on December 9 and 11, 2016.

The Stanford Cardinal successfully defended their 2015 title. Stanford played the North Carolina Tar Heels to a scoreless draw in the semifinals before winning a penalty shootout, 10–9, to advance to the Championship game. The Cardinal then also tied the Wake Forest Demon Deacons, 0–0, in the final before claiming the back-to-back title with another penalty shootout victory, 5–4.

Stanford tied the NCAA record for the Lowest Goals-Against Average in the Tournament (Minimum 3 Games) of 0.00 by becoming the fourth team to not allow their opponents to score a goal in the tournament. The other three co-record-holders are the 1976 San Francisco Dons, the 1995 Wisconsin Badgers, and the 2009 Akron Zips.

Qualification

All Division I men's soccer programs except for Grand Canyon, Incarnate Word, and UMass Lowell will be eligible to qualify for the tournament. Those three programs are ineligible because they are in transition from Division II to Division I. The tournament field remains fixed at 48 teams.

Of the 24 schools that had previously won the championship, 13 qualified for this year's tournament.

Format 
As in previous editions of the NCAA Division I Tournament, the tournament features 48 participants out of a possible field of 203 teams. Of the 48 berths, 24 are allocated to the 21 conference tournament champions and to the regular season winners of the Ivy League, Pac-12 Conference, and West Coast Conference, which do not have tournaments. The remaining 24 berths are supposed to be determined through an at-large process based upon the Ratings Percentage Index (RPI) of teams that did not automatically qualify.

The NCAA Selection Committee also names the top sixteen seeds for the tournament, with those teams receiving an automatic bye into the second round of the tournament. The remaining 32 teams play in a single-elimination match in the first round of the tournament for the right to play a seeded team in the second round.

Schedule

Bracket

Regional 1

Regional 2

Regional 3

Regional 4

2016 College Cup

Results

First round

Second round

Third round

Quarterfinals

College Cup

Semifinals

national championship

Statistics

Goalscorers 

4 goals

 Julian Gressel — Providence

3 goals

 Alex Happi — Clemson
 Foster Langsdorf — Stanford
 Brian Wright — Vermont
 Nico Quashie — Virginia Tech
 Jon Bakero — Wake Forest

2 goals

 Nick Hinds — Akron
 Austen Burnikel — Clemson
 Kortne Ford — Denver
 Andre Shinyashiki — Denver
 Albert Ruiz — Florida Gulf Coast
 Tate Schmitt — Louisville
 Amar Sejdič — Maryland
 Tucker Hume — North Carolina
 Jon Gallagher — Notre Dame
 Sergio Carmago — Syracuse
 Abu Danladi — UCLA
 Marcelo Acuña — Virginia Tech
 Ema Twumasi — Wake Forest

1 goal

 Carlos Clark — Albany
 Bernardo Mattos — Albany
 Afonso Pinheiro — Albany
 Nico Solabarrieta — Albany
 Zeiko Lewis — Boston College
 Brandt Bronico — Charlotte
 Daniel Bruce — Charlotte
 Einar Einarsson — Coastal Carolina
 Frantzdy Pierrot — Coastal Carolina
 Zach Pagani — Colgate
 Bruno Scodari — Colgate
 Myles Englis — Creighton
 Mitch LaGro — Creighton
 Ricky Lopez-Espin — Creighton
 Ricardo Perez — Creighton
 Joel Rydstrand — Creighton
 Karim Sawaf — Creighton
 Matt Danilack — Dartmouth
 Chandler Crosswait — Denver
 Scott DeVoss — Denver
 Alex Underwood — Denver
 Robert Ferrer — Florida Gulf Coast
 Justin Gavin — Florida Gulf Coast
 Grant Lillard — Indiana
 Billy McConnell — Indiana
 Kevin Barajas — Kentucky
 J. J. Williams — Kentucky
 Cherif Dieye — Louisville
 Jack Gayton — Louisville
 Mohamed Thiaw — Louisville
 Kevin Engesser — Loyola-Chicago
 Alec Lasinski — Loyola-Chicago
 Gordon Wild — Maryland
 Eryk Williamson — Maryland
 Michael Marcantognini — Michigan State
 Patrick Khouri — New Mexico
 Nils Bruening — North Carolina
 Jeremy Kelly — North Carolina
 Drew Murphy — North Carolina
 Tariq Branche — Pacific
 Danny Griffin — Providence
 Steven Kilday — Providence
 Brendan Reardon — Providence
 Nick Sailor — Providence
 João Serrano — Providence
 Fraser Colmer — Radford
 Arthur Herpreck — Rider
 A. J. Vergara — San Diego State
 Tomas Hilliard-Arce — Stanford
 Sam Werner — Stanford
 Austin Ledbetter — SIU Edwardsville
 Keegan McHugh — SIU Edwardsville
 Kevin Walker — South Carolina
 Marcus Epps — South Florida
 Lindo Mfeka — South Florida
 Chris Nanco — Syracuse
 José Hernández — UCLA
 Kike Poleo — UCLA
 Willie Raygoza — UCLA
 Adam Musovski — UNLV
 Jon Arnar Barðdal — Vermont
 Stefan Lamanna — Vermont
 Pablo Aguilar — Virginia
 Paddy Foss — Virginia
 Brendan Moyers — Virginia Tech
 Forrest White — Virginia Tech
 Luis Argudo — Wake Forest
 Ian Harkes — Wake Forest
 Jacori Hayes — Wake Forest
 Beau Blanchard — Washington
 Scott Menzies — Washington
 Elijah Rice — Washington
 Justin Schmidt — Washington
 Steven Wright — Washington

Own goals

 Tanner Dieterich — Clemson (playing against South Carolina)
 Kaelon Fox — Kentucky (playing against Creighton)

See also 
 NCAA Men's Soccer Championships (Division II, Division III)
 NCAA Women's Soccer Championships (Division I, Division II, Division III)

Notes

References 

Tournament
NCAA Division I Men's Soccer Tournament seasons
NCAA Division I men's soccer tournament
NCAA Division I men's soccer tournament
NCAA Division I men's soccer tournament
NCAA Division I men's soccer tournament